

Events
Crown of Assyria seized by Pulu, who took the throne name Tukulti-apil-Esharra.
End of the reign of Zechariah of Israel (746-745).
Suggested start of the reign of Menahem Ben Gadi of Israel.

Births

Deaths

Suggested date for the death of King Shallum of the ancient Kingdom of Israel

References

740s BC